Mohammad Mujtaba (born 1 December 1995) is an Afghan first-class cricketer. He competed at the 2014 Asian Games and in the 2014 ICC Under-19 Cricket World Cup.

References

External links
 

1995 births
Living people
Afghan cricketers
Place of birth missing (living people)
Asian Games medalists in cricket
Cricketers at the 2014 Asian Games
Asian Games silver medalists for Afghanistan
Medalists at the 2014 Asian Games